Franco E. Prosperi (born 1928) is a journalist and marine scientist who became a documentary director and producer. He is best known for his lasting collaboration with Gualtiero Jacopetti in the mondo film genre. His only fictional film was Wild Beasts (Belve feroci).

References

1928 births
Italian film directors
Living people